Restelicë is a Gorani village in the south of Kosovo, the largest in the municipality of Dragash, located in the Gora region.

Notes

References 

Villages in Dragash
Gorani people